Phyllis Zweig Chinn (née Zweig, born September 26, 1941) is an American mathematician who holds a professorship in mathematics, women's studies, and teaching preparation at Humboldt State University in California. Her publications concern graph theory, mathematics education, and the history of women in mathematics.

Education and career 
Chinn was born in Rochester, New York and graduated in 1962 from Brandeis University. She earned her Ph.D. in 1969 from the University of California, Santa Barbara with a dissertation on graph isomorphism supervised by Paul Kelly. 
She taught at Towson State College, a training school for teachers in Maryland, from 1969 to 1975, and earned tenure there in 1974, before moving to Humboldt State. At the time she joined the Humboldt State faculty, she was the first female mathematics professor there; the only other female professor in the sciences was a biologist.

In 1997 she became chair of the mathematics department at Humboldt State.

Contributions
Chinn has written highly cited work on graph bandwidth, dominating sets, and on bandwidth.

Chinn is also an avid juggler, and founded a juggling club at Humboldt State in the 1980s.

Recognition
Humboldt State named Chinn as Outstanding Professor for 1988–1989.
She was the 2010 winner of the Louise Hay Award for Contributions to Mathematics Education, given by the Association for Women in Mathematics, for her work in improving mathematics education at the middle and high school levels and encouraging young women to become mathematicians.

References

External links
Home page

1941 births
Living people
20th-century American mathematicians
21st-century American mathematicians
American women mathematicians
Graph theorists
American historians of mathematics
Mathematics educators
Brandeis University alumni
Towson University faculty
Humboldt State University faculty
20th-century women mathematicians
21st-century women mathematicians
21st-century American women